RGC may refer to:

 Rangamati Government College
 Radial glial cell
 Receiver General for Canada
 Retinal ganglion cell
 Retro Game Challenge
 Revolutionary Guard Corps
 RGC 1404, a Welsh rugby union franchise
 Rio Grande City, Texas
 Robert Gordon's College
 The Royal Glenora Club
 Royal Government of Cambodia
 Russian Government Cup, a bandy tournament

Companies
 Renison Goldfields Consolidated, former Australian mining company, now part of Iluka Resources